This is a list of television programs formerly broadcast by the defunct Canadian television channel Comedy Gold and its previous incarnation as TV Land Canada.

This a list of programs currently being broadcast as of Fall 2018.

Final Programming

A-E
 Adam Ruins Everything (2018-2019)
 Anger Management (2018-2019)
 Comedy Bang! Bang! (2018-2019)
 Comedy Now! (2015-2019)
 Community (2018-2019)
 Corner Gas (2015-2019)
 Everybody Hates Chris (2018-2019)

F-J
 The First Family (2018-2019)
 Fameless (2018-2019)
 Impastor (2018-2019)
 The Jim Gaffigan Show (2018-2019)

K-O
 Mr. Box Office (2018-2019)

P-T
 Ridiculousness (2018-2019)
 Spun Out (2017-2019)
 Tosh.O (2018-2019)

Past

0-9
 21 Jump Street (2005–2009)

A-E
 The Addams Family (2003–2005)
 Adderly (2003–2009)                                                                               
 Adventures in Rainbow Country (2006–2008)                                                    
 Airwaves (2001–2003)
 The Andy Griffith Show (2008–2011) 
 The Beachcombers
 Bizarre (2008–2011)
 Car 54, Where Are You? (2002–2004)
 Check It Out! (2001–2006, 2011–2013)                           
 Comedy Bang! Bang! (2018)
 The Comedy Mill
 Coming Up Rosie (2001–2006)
 Dallas (2002–2009)
 Dan for Mayor (2017–present)
 The David Steinberg Show (30-minute 1976 version) (2011–2017)
 Designing Women (2010–2012)
 Diff'rent Strokes (2002–2003)

F-J
 The Facts of Life (2002-2004)
 Family Ties (2002–2005)
 Fantasy Island (2007–2010)
 The First Family (2018)
 The Forest Rangers (2003–2005)
 Get Smart (2001–2005)
 Happy Days (2003–2010)
 Hart to Hart (2007–2010)
 Hawaii Five-O (2001–2005)
 Hiccups (2017-2018)
 The Hilarious House of Frightenstein (2008–2010)
 I Pity the Fool (2006)
 Inside the Box (2013–2017)
 It's Garry Shandling's Show (2007–2010)
 Joanie Loves Chachi (2007–2009)

K-O
 The Kids in the Hall (2001–2004, 2010–2017)
 King of Kensington (2003–2008)
 Lassie (2001–2004, 2006–2010)
 Love, American Style (2007–2010)
 The Love Boat (2001–2002)
 MacGyver (2001–2002)
 Mama's Family (2003-2012)
 The Mary Tyler Moore Show (2005–2008, 2010–2017)
 Match Game (CBS incarnation)  (2012–2016)
 The Millionaire (2002–2005)
 Murphy Brown (2010–2013)
 My Three Sons (2001–2006)
 The New Lassie (2005–2007)
 The New Addams Family (2013–2016)
 Newhart (2010–2017)
 Night Court (2010–2017)
 The Odd Couple (2016–2017)
 One Day at a Time (2011–2013)

P-T
 Peep Show (2001–2005)
 Perry Mason (2001–2006)
 Petticoat Junction (2006–2010)
 The Phil Silvers Show (2008–2010)
 Ready or Not (2008–2010)
 The Red Green Show (2009–2017)
 Rhoda (2001–2005, 2011–2017)
 Sanford and Son (2002–2004)
 SCTV (2002–2003, 2010–2017)
 Sister, Sister (2006-2011)
 Smith & Smith (2005–2008)
 Soap (2011–2013)
 The Super Dave Osborne Show (2011–2015)
 Swiss Family Robinson (2006–2008)
 Trapper John, M.D. (2001–2003)

U-Z
 Veranda Beach Comedy Club (2007–2010)
 Who's the Boss? (2011–2014)
 Wings (August 5, 2013 – 2017)
 Wiseguy (2006–2009)

References

External links
 Comedy Gold
 Bell Media Site - Comedy Gold

Comedy Gold